The 1967 Kentucky Derby was the 93rd running of the Kentucky Derby. The race took place on May 6, 1967.

Full results

 Winning Breeder: John W. Galbreath; (KY)

References

1967
Kentucky Derby
Derby
Kentucky
Kentucky Derby